Rang Tang is a musical that premiered July 12, 1927, on Broadway at the Royale Theater and ran for 119 performances, including a 14-week overrun, during which, the production moved September 12, 1927, to the Majestic – finishing October 24, 1927. It was acclaimed as one of the most successful black musical revues of the latter 1920s, and owed much to a star-laden cast headlined by Flournoy Miller and Aubrey Lyles. The book — in 2 acts and 12 scenes (2 scenes added later) — is by Kaj Gynt; the lyrics are by Joseph H. Trent; the music is composed by Ford Dabney, who tailored some of the songs for Mae Barnes and Evelyn Preer; the score and post-production music was published by Leo Feist; all copyrighted in 1927 and copyrights renewed in 1954.

History 
The production premiered  after the world's first solo transatlantic flight – from Roosevelt Field, Mineola, Long Island, to Le Bourget Aerodrome, Paris, by Charles Lindbergh. The musical title, Rang Tang, is slang for orangutan.

Plot 
Sam Peck (Miller) and Steve Jenkins (Lyles) are two debt-ridden Jimtown barbers who flee their creditors, steal an airplane, and, in the spirit of Charles Lindbergh, embark on another, further, albeit non-solo, first transatlantic non-stop flight from America to Africa in search of treasure. Toward the end of their destination, however, while in flight, the plane begins to malfunction and the wings fall off. Following a safe emergency splash landing in the sea near Madagascar, they meet (i) the Queen of Sheba (Josephine Hall), (ii) the King of Madagascar (Daniel L. Haynes), and (iii) a Zulu tribe. Peck and Jenkins become involved in series of comedic misadventures with natives and fierce animals in the forests, jungles, and deserts – staged as a mythical, exotic, and, at times, terrifying native land. They find a buried treasure, return to the U.S., and arrive at a Harlem cabaret, where they celebrate in grand style their new status as two of the richest men in the world.

Book, lyrics, melodies, arrangements 

 Book: Kaj Gynt (1885–1956)
 Lyrics: Jo Trent (né Joseph Hannibal Trent; 1892–1954)
 Music: Ford Dabney (1883–1958)
 Orchestrations and vocal arrangements: Russell Wooding (né Alfred Russell Wooding; 1891–1959)

Premier production 

 Choreography: Charles Davis (né C. Columbus Davis; 1894–1963) ‡
 Staging: Flournoy E. Miller (1885–1971)
 Set design: Olle Nordmark (1890–1973)
 Costume design: Olle Nordmark
 Costume execution: Hilarie Mahieu Costumes, Inc. – Hilarie Albert Mahieu (1877–1964)
 Masks, lantern heads, and shields: H. Foster Anderson
 Orchestra direction: Ford Dabney
 Produced by Walker and Kavanagh – Antoinette Walker (maiden; 1874–1970) and husband, Michael Joseph Patrick Kavanagh (1887–1967)

Opening night cast 

 Flournoy E. Miller (1885–1971), as Sam Peck, a barber ‡
 Aubrey Lyles (1884–1932), as Steve Jenkins, a barber ‡
 Josephine Hall (née Josephine Allen; born 1890), as Queen of Sheba and singer
 Evelyn Preer (1896–1932)
 Daniel L. Haynes (1889–1954), as King of Madagascar and chorus member (baritone)
 Inez Draw, singer
 Lillian Westmoreland (maiden; 1906–1935), a so-called "double-voiced" talent – the ability to sing both soprano and alto
 Barnes, Mack, Jones dance trio
 Mae Barnes (1907–1996), dancer
 Lavinia Mack (born about 1908), dancer
 Byron Jones (1889–1934), dancer
 Cast (continued)
 Zaidee Jackson (1898–1970), as Magnolia
 Crawford Jackson
 Joe Willis
 Ralph Bryson, dancer

 Male chorus

 Daniel L. Haynes (1889–1954), bass
 Ambrose Allen
 Howard Brown
 C.H. Gordon
 Gilbert Holland
 Burble Jackson
 Snippy Mason (né Arthur Robinson Mason; 1891–1976), tenor ‡
 Llewellyn Ransom (né Llewellyn Aloysius Ransom; 1901–1972), tenor
 James E. Strange (né James Easton Strange; 1895–1956), as barbershop customer and chorus member, tenor
 Joseph Willis
 Clarence Todd
 Edwin Alexander
 George Battles
 Edward Thompson (né James Edward Thompson; 1898–1960), who, in 1924, married Evelyn Preer

 Ladies of the ensemble

 Le 'Etta' Revells
 Pauline Jackson
 Susie Baker
 Gladyce Bronson
 Doris Colbert
 La Valla Cook
 Inez Draw
 Teddy Garnette
 Alice Hoffman
 Margie Hubbard
 Frances Hubbard
 Evelyn Keyes (1908–1990)
 Marie Mahood (née Marie Hardina Mahood; born 12 May 1904 Queens, NYC), as one of six of wives of Chief Bobo; in 1928, she married Marion W. Griffen (1903–2000)
 Frankye Maxwell
 Thelma McLaughlin
 Marel Miles
 Thula Ortes
 Thelma Rhoton
 Gladys Schell
 Helen Smith
 Norma Smith
 Gomez Boyer
 Mildred Coleman
 Leonore Gadsden
 Isabel Peterson
 Ethelyn Boyd
 Irma Miles
 Marie Simmons
 Anna Humphrey
 Gertrude Williams

 Ford Dabney's Rang Tang Orchestra
 In September 1927, "The Witch Doctor," a new scene by Trent and Dabney was added to the show.

 ‡ Member of the 1921 Shuffle Along cast

Songs 

 Rang Tang; 
 "Rang Tang," fox-trot song; Dabney (music), Trent (words), Frank E. Barry (arrangement); 
 "Rang Tang," Dabney (melody), Trent (words)
 "Brown;" Dabney (music), Trent (words), ; Zaidee Jackson, vocalist
 "Come to Africa," Dabney and Trent (words & melody); Josephine Hall, vocalist
 "Ee Yah," hunting song, Dabney (melody), Trent (words)
 "Everybody Shout," Dabney and Trent (words & music)
 "Feelin' Kinda Good," Dabney and Trent (words & melody)
 "Harlem," Dabney and Trent (words & melody)
 "Jubilee in Monkeyland," Dabney and Trent (words & melody)
 "Jungle Rose," Dabney and Trent (words & melody); ; Evelyn Preer, vocalist
 "Jungle Rose," fox trot, Dabney (music), Trent (words)
 "King and Queen," Dabney and Trent (words & melody)
 "Pay Me," Dabney and Trent (words & melody)
 "Sammy and Topsy," Dabney (melody), Trent (words)
 "Sammy's Banjo," Dabney and Trent (words & melody)
 "Six Little Wives" (of Chief Bobo), Dabney and Trent (words & melody)
 "Someday," Dabney (melody), Trent (words); Josephine Hall, vocalist
 "Sweet Evening Breeze," Dabney and Trent (words & melody)
 "Voodoo," Dabney (melody), Trent (words)
 "Zulu Fifth Avenue," Dabney and Trent (words & melody)

 Not listed in Catalogue of Copyright Entries:
 "Summer Nights," Josephine Hall, vocalist
 "Tramps of the Desert"

Post Broadway performances 
After closing on Broadway, Rang Tang opened in
 Brooklyn: Werba's Theater
 Baltimore: Ford's Theatre – opened October 24, 1927, for a 1-week engagement
 Boston: Tremont Theatre – November 28, 1927
 New Haven, Connecticut: Shubert Theatre – opened December 29, 1927
 Jamaica, Queens, New York City: Cort Theater – January 1928; John Cort's theater, on 175th Street at Jamaica Avenue; opened August 22, 1927, with the American stage premier of Mr. What's His Name; the structure was designed by Eugene DeRosa
 Harlem: Lafayette Theatre – opened February 13, 1928

Other productions 
 Staged and produced by Edward E. Daley (1884–1933), starring Billy Higgins (1888–1937) and Joe Byrd (né Joseph Byrd; 1886–1946)
 Chicago: Woods Theatre – opened June 20, 1928, close July 14, 1928
 Detroit (Paradise Valley): Koppin Theater – opened July 28, 1928; note: the Koppin Theater, owned by Henry Koppin (né Henry Emil Koppin; 1900–1961), opened August 27, 1927, and closed in 1929, after the Wall Street Crash of 1929

Legacy as employer of African Americans in Broadway theater 
In an informal survey of integrated casts in the 1927 Broadway season, Pittsburgh Courier reporter Floyd J. Calvin (1902–1939) wrote:

Gallery

See also 
 African-American musical theater

Notes, copyrights, references

Notes

Copyrights 
 Original copyrights

Note: sheet music copyrighted in the U.S. (a) prior to 1925 with copyright renewal or (b) from 1925 through 1963 without copyright renewal is deemed public domain.
 Catalog of Copyright Entries, Part 1, Group 3:  Class D: Dramatic Compositions, Motion Pictures, New Series, Library of Congress, Copyright Office

 Catalog of Copyright Entries, Part 3 Musical Compositions, New Series, Library of Congress, Copyright Office

 Catalog of Copyright Entries, Third Series, Renewal Registrations – Music

 Renewals

Genealogical records

Further reading 

 The ASCAP Biographical Dictionary (3rd ed.), American Society of Composers, Authors and Publishers (1966)
 Biographical Dictionary of American Music, by Charles Eugene Claghorn (1911–2005), West Nyack: Parker Publishing Company, Inc. (1973)
 The Oxford Companion to Popular Music, by Peter Gammond (1925–2019), Oxford Companions, Oxford University Press (1991)
 Biography Index, A cumulative index to biographical material in books and magazines, Vol. 14, September 1984 – August 1986, H.W. Wilson Co. (1986)
 Profiles of African American Stage Performers and Theatre People, 1816–1960, by Bernard L. Peterson, Jr., Greenwood Press (2001)
 Biographical Dictionary of Afro-American and African Musicians, by Eileen Jackson Southern (1920–2002), Greenwood Press (1982) (borrowable online via )
 In Black and White, A guide to magazine articles, newspaper articles, and books concerning black individuals and groups (3rd ed.; Vol. 1 of 2), Mary Mace Spradling (née Mary Elizabeth Mace; 1911–2009) (ed.), Gale Research (1980); 
 In Black and White (3rd ed.; supplement), Mary Mace Spradling (née Mary Elizabeth Mace; 1911–2009) (ed.), Gale Research (1985);

Inline

Historic newspapers, magazines, and journals

External links
 
 
 
 

Broadway musicals
Revues
All-Black cast Broadway shows
1927 musicals